Richard Aldworth may refer to:

 Richard Aldworth (Parliamentarian), English politician, MP for Bristol 1646–1653
 Richard Aldworth (MP for Dublin University) (died 1707), MP for Dublin University (Irish House of Commons) 1695–1703
 Richard Aldworth (Reading MP) (c. 1614–1680), English politician, MP for Reading 1661–1679, and founder of the Blue Coat Schools in Reading and Basingstoke
 Richard Griffin, 2nd Baron Braybrooke (1750–1825), an English politician and MP for Reading, known as Richard Aldworth-Neville until he succeeded to the baronetcy in 1797
 Richard Neville Aldworth Neville (1717–1793), an English politician, MP for Reading, and diplomat

See also
Aldworth School in Basingstoke, formerly Richard Aldworth School